Magnes (Greek: Μάγνης) was an Athenian comic poet of the 5th century BC. Magnes and his contemporary Chionides are the earliest comic poets for whom victories are recorded in the literary competition of the Dionysia festival.

Titles of his comedies:

Βαρβίτιδες (Barbitides), Guitarists of Barbiton
Βάτραχοι (Batrachoi), Frogs
Γαλεομυομαχία (Galeomyomachia), Battle of Cats and Mice
Διόνυσος (Dionysos), Dionysus
Λυδοί (Lydoi), Lydians
Ὄρνιθες (Ornithes), Birds
Πιτακίς ή Πυτακίδης (Pitakis or Pytakidis, related to Pita, Pytia or Pittakion, Wax tablet)
Ποάστρια (Poastria), Female Farm-Worker (derived from Poa)
Ψῆνες (Psenes), Fig wasps

References
Magnes Dictionary of Greek and Roman Biography and Mythology
Magnes Theatrehistory.com
Aristotle, Poetics, III 

5th-century BC Athenians
Ancient Greek dramatists and playwrights
5th-century BC writers
Old Comic poets